Underground Operations was an independent punk rock record label based in Toronto, Ontario, Canada.  Established in 1995, the label was originally based in Ajax, Ontario.
Operated by Mark Spicoluk, former Closet Monster member and former bass player for Avril Lavigne, this label was one of the most successful independent labels in Canada. Spicoluk started the label when he was 16 years of age. Underground Operations shut down on December 2, 2016.

Bands
Abandon All Ships
The Artist Life
Aspirations
Bombs Over Providence
Closet Monster
Chad Michael Stewart/Machete Avenue
Dead Letter Dept
Dean Lickyer
Diemonds
Hands & Teeth
Heart Attack Kids
The Holly Springs Disaster
Hostage Life
I Hate Sally
Kathleen Turner Overdrive
Kingdoms (band)|Kingdoms
Lights
Marilyn's Vitamins
Means
Protest the Hero
Rob Moir
Skynet (band)|Skynet
These Silhouettes

Discography
1999: Closet Monster – A Fight for What Is Right
2000: Closet Monster – Where the Fuck Is Revolution?
2002: Protest the Hero – Search for the Truth EP
2002: (coles) Notes From The Underground compilation
2002: Closet Monster – Killed the Radio Star
2003: Marilyn's Vitamins – Vans Don't Run On Love And Records Aren't Pressed With Smiles
2003: Bombs Over Providence – Liberty's Ugly Best Friend
2003: Protest the Hero – A Calculated Use of Sound EP
2004: Hostage Life – Sing for the Enemy EP
2004: Closet Monster – We Re-Built This City
2004: Greetings from the Underground compilation
2005: The Power of Music compilation
2005: Dead Letter Dept. – Rock N' Roll Hates You
2005: The Brat Attack – From This Beauty Comes Chaos And Mayhem
2005: Bombs Over Providence – Shake Your Body Politic
2005: Summer 2005 Sampler compilation
2005: Protest the Hero – Kezia
2006: Machete Avenue – The First Cuts
2006: I Hate Sally – Don't Worry Lady
2006: Hostage Life – Walking Papers LP
2007: Summer 2007 Sampler compilation
2007: The Holly Springs Disaster – Motion Sickness Love
2007: I Hate Sally vs. GFK – Sp(l)it EP
2007: These Silhouettes – The Thomas EP EP
2008: Summer 2008 Sampler compilation
2008: Chad Michael Stewart – Machete Avenue
2008: Dean Lickyer – Dean Lickyer
2008: Means – To Keep Me from Sinking
2008: Protest the Hero – Fortress
2008: Lights – Lights EP
2008: Aspirations – EP! EP
2008: The Artist Life – Let's Start a Riot EP
2008: Kathleen Turner Overdrive – Marauders!Wolves!Scavengers!Party!
2009: Kingdoms – Daughters of Atlas EP
2009: Protest the Hero – Gallop Meets the Earth
2009: The Artist Life – Let's Start a Campfire EP
2010: Abandon All Ships – Geeving
2011: Protest the Hero – Scurrilous
2011: The Artist Life – Impossible
2012: DVBBS – Initio
2012: Abandon All Ships – Infamous
2012: Diemonds – The Bad Pack
2013: Rob Moir – Places to Die
2013: Skynet – The Wild EP
2014: Abandon All Ships – Malocchio
2014: Hands & Teeth – Before the Light EP
2014: Underground Operations / Cloud Empire 2014 Sampler compilation
2014: Hands & Teeth – Digital 7" EP
2015: Diemonds – Never Wanna Die
2015: Rob Moir – Adventure Handbook
2016: Heart Attack Kids – No Future
2016: Closet Monster – Suicide Note compilation

See also

 List of record labels

References

External links
 Official site
 Underground Operations on Myspace

Record labels established in 1995
Canadian independent record labels
Companies based in Toronto
Punk record labels